R. Surendren (born on 26 October 1982) in Taiping, Perak is a Malaysia footballer. He is a former member of the Malaysian national team. He has more than 20 years of experience in football industry with a coaching certificate of AFC ‘C’ License.

Career 
R. Surendren started his career as a junior football player in 1996 with a bronze medal in Perak Coca-cola Cup U-16 with his team. In 1998, he participated in Perak MSSM U-18 & Perak MILO Cup U-18 with his teammate.
In 1999, he played with Perak TKN Football Club and joined FAM Cup. Then, he participated in Malay Mail Malaysia Premier League in year 2000 to 2001.
R. Surendren started his senior career when he represented Perak from 2002 until 2007 and had participated in finals of Malaysia Cup, FA Cup and Sultan Haji Ahmad Shah Cup, quarter finals of AFC Cup and won gold medal in Sukma Sabah (2002).
Then, he joined and represented Selangor from 2008 until 2012. During those years, his team had won major title such as Malaysia Cup & FA Cup in 2008 - 2009 and Super League Malaysia and Malaysia Charity Shield in 2009 - 2010. In 2011, he and his teammate Mohd Zaiza Zainal Abidin left Selangor to join Pahang. After one season with Pahang he returned to Selangor for 2012 season.
He then joined Malaysian Armed Force @ ATM FA in 2013 and moved to Sabah in 2015 before ending his career as professional football player in 2017 with Penang.
He is currently a Chief Executive Officer (CEO) for MNY Football Club (MNYFC), operate in Ipoh, Perak.

National team 
In his glory years from 2002 to 2006, he excelled with his playing position as a striker by representing Malaysia team as National Senior Squad. He represented Malaysia team for Olympics and won Bronze medal during SEA Games in Philippines & Vietnam. He also represented Malaysian team under-23 for Pre-Olympics & Sea Games in Vietnam which coached by Allan Harris, Malaysian team under-21 International Youth Championship Tournament (participated by Brazil & Portugal) and won Bronze medal during 2002 Hassanal Bolkiah Trophy through Malaysia team under-21.

Honours

Club
Perak FA
 Malaysia Premier League: 2003
 Malaysia FA Cup: 2004
 Malaysia Cup: Runners-up 2006 
 Malaysia Charity Shield: 2005, 2006 

Selangor FA
 Malaysia Super League: 2009, 2010
 Malaysia FA Cup: 2009, Runners-up 2008
 Malaysia Cup: 2008
 Malaysia Charity Shield: 2009, 2010

ATM FA
 Malaysia Charity Shield: 2013

References

[[

]]

External links
 MNYFC Website
 
 Surendran Rasiah profile at Tribuna.com
 
 2014 News at Goal.com
 2008 Tamil News

1982 births
Living people
Malaysian footballers
Malaysian people of Tamil descent
Tamil sportspeople
Malaysian sportspeople of Indian descent
Malaysia international footballers
Malaysia Super League players
Perak F.C. players
Selangor FA players
Sri Pahang FC players
ATM FA players
Sabah F.C. (Malaysia) players
Penang F.C. players
People from Perak
Association football forwards